Joanne Black (born 25 October 1974 in County Cavan, Ireland) is an Irish businesswoman and fashion stylist based in Los Angeles. She won Miss Ireland in 1995 and went on to build a career in the fashion industry. In 2020 she co-founded Aeraid PR, the first sustainable PR agency in US.

Early life and education
Joanne grew up in County Cavan, Ireland, the fourth of 6 children. She later moved to Limerick where she started her modelling career whilst studying Art and Design at the Limerick Institute of Technology. In 1995 Joanne won Miss Limerick Photogenic, then Miss Ireland, at the age of 20. She represented Ireland at the Miss World event in Cape Town in November 1995 where she had the honour of meeting Nelson Mandela. In 1996 she also represented Ireland at the Miss Universe contest in Las Vegas.

Career
Black began her career as a model with the Celia Holman Lee Agency in 1990. She was crowned Miss Limerick Photogenic, then Miss Ireland in 1995. Black was then described as ‘Ireland’s most eligible young woman. In 1999 Joanne moved to New York City to study acting at the Lee Strasberg Theatre and Film Institute and model part-time. After finishing her studies in New York City, Joanne moved to London in 2002 to study Fashion Styling and Production at the London College of Fashion. Having gained significant experience in the fashion industry she decided to begin a career as a fashion stylist. Joanne has worked with numerous celebrities and her work appeared in the most prestigious fashion publications in the world.

In 2015 Joanne decided to move to Los Angeles to begin her career as a Celebrity stylist. In 2020 Joanne opened the first sustainable Pr agency Aeraid Pr in L.A. with her partner Victoria Vromen. Her experience in sustainable fashion started years ago with her collaboration with supermodel and philanthropist Petra Němcová who has been the first celebrity committed to wear exclusively sustainable brands. Today Joanne is considered a reference within the sustainable fashion industry.

References

External links
 Joanne Black’s official site

1974 births
Irish female models
Living people
Miss Ireland winners
Miss Universe 1996 contestants
Miss World 1995 delegates
Beauty pageant contestants from Ireland